The 1983 Lafayette Leopards football team was an American football team that represented Lafayette College as an independent during the 1983 NCAA Division I-AA football season.

In their third year under head coach Bill Russo, the Leopards compiled a 6–5 record. Rich Doverspike, Frank Novak and Craig Williams were the team captains.

Starting the season with a four-game win streak, the Leopards made it into the Division I-AA weekly national rankings in the middle of the campaign, but were unranked by season's end.

Lafayette played its home games at Fisher Field on College Hill in Easton, Pennsylvania.

Schedule

References

Lafayette
Lafayette Leopards football seasons
Lafayette Leopards football